Juan Carlos Patino-Arango was a Roman Catholic seminarian who is accused of child molestation and indecency.  While studying in a Roman Catholic seminary, he allegedly molested four boys, who have since filed suit against him, the Archdiocese of Galveston-Houston, Archbishop Joseph Fiorenza and Pope Benedict XVI, charging that the church conspired to cover up the crime. A settlement was reached in the Houston church sex abuse case. In May 2005 in Texas, he was indicted on a felony criminal charge of indecency with a child.

Diplomatic immunity request of Pope

When Pope Benedict was personally accused in a lawsuit of conspiring to cover up the molestation of three boys in Texas by Patino-Arango in Archdiocese of Galveston-Houston, he sought and obtained diplomatic immunity from prosecution. Some have claimed that this immunity was granted after intervention by then US President George W. Bush. The Department of State "recognize[d] and allow[ed] the immunity of Pope Benedict XVI from this suit."

See also

Catholic sex abuse cases

References

American Roman Catholic priests
Catholic Church sexual abuse scandals in the United States
Year of birth missing (living people)
Living people